The Galehorn (or Galenhorn) is a mountain of the Swiss Pennine Alps, located between the Nanztal and the Simplontal.

References

External links
 Galehorn on Hikr

Mountains of the Alps
Mountains of Switzerland
Mountains of Valais